Agaricus californicus, commonly known as the California agaricus, is a poisonous mushroom in the section Xanthodermati of the genus Agaricus.

It is mildly poisonous, causing gastrointestinal upset in many individuals. The etiology of these symptoms is unclear and some individuals can eat it without experiencing symptoms, but since there is no way to tell who can eat the mushroom safely it is generally recommended against.

Description
The spores are brown and smooth.

Differentiating A. californicus
Agaricus californicus is similar in general appearance to many other Agaricus species, especially to A. arvensis, A. bisporus, A. campestris, A. cupreobrunneus, and which are commonly collected for the table. Since A. californicus is toxic, differentiating it from other similar mushrooms is important.

Agaricus californicus – like many other Agaricus species of the section Xanthodermati – displays a yellowing reaction where its flesh has been damaged. Unlike A. xanthodermus (a close relative in the section Xanthodermati), A. californicuss yellowing reaction is not always readily apparent and the annulus is smaller. Even in specimens where the reaction is not immediately apparent the addition of a basic solution such as NaOH or even Lysol will cause the reaction to become quite noticeable, making this a convenient way to distinguish between A. californicus and similar mushrooms.

See also
List of Agaricus species

References

External links

californicus
Fungi of California
Fungi described in 1895
Taxa named by Charles Horton Peck
Fungi without expected TNC conservation status